Apalocnemis is a genus of flies in the family Empididae.

Species
A. acuticornis (Loew, 1850)
A. canadambris Grimaldi & Cumming, 1999
A. cingulata Bezzi, 1909
A. circumspinosa Collin, 1933
A. discreta Collin, 1933
A. distincta Collin, 1933
A. echinata Collin, 1933
A. elongata Collin, 1933
A. fumosa (Hutton, 1901)
A. fumosa (Hutton, 1901)
A. gracilis (Meunier, 1908)
A. gracilis (Meunier, 1908)
A. halterata Becker, 1919
A. halterata Collin, 1933
A. hirsuta Melander, 1946
A. holosericea Thomson, 1869
A. indefinita Collin, 1933
A. ingeniosa Collin, 1933
A. innocua Collin, 1933
A. intonsa Collin, 1933
A. maura Collin, 1933
A. mediocris Collin, 1933
A. obscura Philippi, 1865
A. ochracea Bigot, 1888
A. oreas Melander, 1946
A. palpata (Loew, 1850)
A. philippii Smith, 1962
A. plorator Collin, 1933
A. racemata Collin, 1933
A. rostrata Collin, 1933
A. salesopolis Smith, 1962
A. sanguinea Hardy, 1934
A. simulans Collin, 1928
A. solitaria Collin, 1933
A. variegata Bezzi, 1905
A. xanthogyna Collin, 1933

References

Empidoidea genera
Empididae